A video file format is a type of  file format for storing digital video data on a computer system. Video is almost always stored using lossy compression to reduce the file size.

A video file normally consists of a container (e.g. in the Matroska format) containing visual (video without audio) data in a video coding format (e.g. VP9) alongside audio data in an audio coding format (e.g. Opus). The container can also contain synchronization information, subtitles, and metadata such as title. A standardized (or in some cases de facto standard) video file type such as .webm is a profile specified by a restriction on which container format and which video and audio compression formats are allowed.

The coded video and audio inside a video file container (i.e. not headers, footers, and metadata) is called the essence. A program (or hardware) which can decode compressed video or audio is called a codec; playing or encoding a video file will sometimes require the user to install a codec library corresponding to the type of video and audio coding used in the file.

Good design normally dictates that a file extension enables the user to derive which program will open the file from the file extension. That is the case with some video file formats, such as WebM (.webm), Windows Media Video (.wmv), Flash Video (.flv), and Ogg Video (.ogv), each of which can only contain a few well-defined subtypes of video and audio coding formats, making it relatively easy to know which codec will play the file. In contrast to that, some very general-purpose container types like AVI (.avi) and QuickTime (.mov) can contain video and audio in almost any format, and have file extensions named after the container type, making it very hard for the end user to use the file extension to derive which codec or program to use to play the files.

The free software FFmpeg project's libraries have very wide support for encoding and decoding video file formats. For example, Google uses ffmpeg to support a wide range of upload video formats for YouTube. One widely used media player using the ffmpeg libraries is the free software VLC media player, which can play most video files that end users will encounter.

List of video file formats

See also
Comparison of video container formats

References

Video
Video formats